In statistics, the antithetic variates method is a variance reduction technique used in Monte Carlo methods. Considering that the error in the simulated signal (using Monte Carlo methods) has a one-over square root convergence, a very large number of sample paths is required to obtain an accurate result. The antithetic variates method reduces the variance of the simulation results.

Underlying principle

The antithetic variates technique consists, for every sample path obtained, in taking its antithetic path — that is given a path  to also take . The advantage of this technique is twofold: it reduces the number of normal samples to be taken to generate N paths, and it reduces the variance of the sample paths, improving the precision.

Suppose that we would like to estimate 

For that we have generated two samples

And 

so variance is reduced if  is negative.

Example 1

If the law of the variable X follows a uniform distribution along [0, 1], the first sample will be   ,  where, for any given i,  is obtained from U(0, 1). Furthermore, covariance is negative, allowing for initial variance reduction.

Example 2: integral calculation

We would like to estimate

and U follows a uniform distribution [0, 1].

The following table compares the classical Monte Carlo estimate (sample size: 2n, where n = 1500) to  the antithetic variates estimate (sample size: n, completed with the transformed sample 1 − ui):

{| cellspacing="1" border="1"
|
| align="right" | Estimate
| align="right" | Standard deviation
|-
| Classical Estimate
| align="right" | 0.69365
| align="right" | 0.00255
|-
| Antithetic Variates 
| align="right" | 0.69399
| align="right" | 0.00063
|}

The use of the antithetic variates method to estimate the result shows an important variance reduction.

See also
 Control variates

References

Variance reduction
Computational statistics
Monte Carlo methods